The Howard County Times is a daily newspaper serving Howard County, Maryland. Although it claims to trace its origins to 1840, it was founded in 1869 as The Ellicott City Times, a weekly newspaper. In 1958 its name was changed to The Howard County Times and it was acquired by the then-independent local publisher Patuxent Publishing Company in 1978, along with other local papers. The Howard County Times is currently a unit of the Baltimore Sun Media Group and maintains its online news page on The Baltimore Sun website. The Howard County Times website and social media pages provide news items from the Times as well as several other local area newspapers and magazines, including the Columbia Flier, the Laurel Leader, and Howard magazine.

History
The Howard County Times traces its history to 1840, when the Howard Free Press was established in Ellicott City, the major town along the upper branches of the Patapsco River (and future county seat) of Howard County, Maryland, just west of Baltimore, the major city and port of Maryland, by Edward Waite and Matthew Fields. The newspaper was published until 1842. Between 1840 and the Civil War, a succession of newspapers opened and closed in Ellicott City (then called Ellicott's Mills) and Howard County. After the Patapsco Enterprise closed in the Fall of 1861, no newspaper was published in Howard County until 1865 when the Howard County Record was founded by publisher Isaiah Wolfersberger.   In 1869, John R. Brown, Jr., a Howard County native who had served in the Confederate Army during the Civil War, purchased the Howard County Record and changed its name to The Ellicott City Times. Under Brown, the newspaper was successful. After Brown's death in 1877, the paper had a number of owners. In 1882, Edwin Warfield, (1848-1920), later Governor of Maryland at the turn of the 19th Century (and future banker and founder/publisher of The Daily Record, a legal/business/finance newspaper (published Monday–Friday) in Baltimore purchased the paper.

In 1920, the paper was owned by Judge James A. Clark, Sr., Paul Talbot and Paul G. ("Pete") Stromberg, (1892-1952), took over as editor. Paul "Pete" Stromberg became a state senator and editor of The Sun, a major daily newspaper in Baltimore. Which coincidentally, decades later would see The Sunpapers, along with its later syndicate chain owner, the Tribune Company (of the Chicago Tribune and the Los Angeles Times), would in turn absorb the Howard County Times in a later merger with its last independent publisher, the Patuxent Publishing Company of Columbia, Maryland. In 1940, Stromberg took control of the Maryland Printing and Publishing Company which gave him sole ownership of the Howard County paper. Stromberg in turn created or purchased over the next few post-war years, 11 new local papers in the suburban (Baltimore County) or outlying Baltimore City communities/neighborhoods ringing around Baltimore, naming his syndicate as the "Stromberg Newspapers" and employed his nephew Charles L Gerwig as editor. Some of these were the Arbutus Times, Catonsville Times, Owings Mills Times, Towson Times, The Jeffersonian, Northeast Record, Northeast Booster, [North] Baltimore Messenger (Baltimore City) and the Laurel Leader (Anne Arundel County/Prince George's County). On November 12, 1958 the name of The Ellicott City Times was changed to The Howard County Times to reflect increased county-wide coverage.

In 1965, The Columbia Times was created as a spin-off newspaper. Stromberg's daughter Doris Stromberg Thompson took over as editor from 1966 to 1978.

Acquisition by Patuxent Publishing
The Columbia Flier was established in 1969, just two years after Rouse began development of Columbia  was formed a coupon flier for the new development of Columbia. As the new town grew, owner Zeke Orlinsky's paper served a larger market than the Times, eventually purchasing the newer paper. Editor Tom Graham would use the paper to encourage the growth of Columbia promoting political candidates that supported the project.
In 1978, Rouse Company Architect Robert Moon designed a new headquarters for the Patuxent Publishing Company in a modernistic building at 10750 Little Patuxent Parkway leading into central Columbia. Moon's wife, worked at the firm as well, becoming editor of the Columbia Flier and then general manager of Patuxent Publishing. The Baltimore Sun media group purchased Patuxent Publishing Company, including the Howard County Times and Columbia Flier, integrating the local papers. The Columbia Flier building was put up for sale, but no tenants were signed on for over three years. In 2014, Former Baltimore Sun editor, and now Public relations director for Howard County David Nitkin announced that the County Executive Ken Ulman directed the purchase of the Flier building by the County for $2.8 million. County Councilperson, Mary Kay Sigaty announced the building where her husband Tom Graham used to work as an editor would be rebuilt as a replacement headquarters for the county's Economic Development Authority and the Maryland Center for Entrepreneurship.

The Howard County Times has since been integrated as a unit of the newly organized local publisher Baltimore Sun Media Group under the former Times Mirror Group of the Los Angeles Times, and later under the purchase of the Tribune Company syndicate of the Chicago Tribune.

Publishers
 Paul G. ("Pete") Stromberg, 1940
 Zeke Orlinsky

See also

 List of newspapers in Maryland

References

External links
Baltimore Sun Media Group: Howard County Times website

Newspapers published in Maryland
Howard County, Maryland
Tribune Publishing
Newspapers established in 1840
1840 establishments in Maryland